Mi Encuentro is the twenty-second (22nd) studio album by Puerto Rican singer Yolandita Monge released in 1997 and her last production for WEA-Latina.  This album marked another radical change of sound for the singer, which included bomba and plena arrangements. The album contains two songs from Puerto Rican singer/songwriter Glenn Monroig, "Yo Solamente", and "Vete Ya", as well as others from known composers.

Also, the singer recorded the previous hits "Cierra Los Ojos Y Juntos Recordemos" (From Floreciendo!) and "Ahora, Ahora" (From Laberinto de Amor) with these new arrangements.  In the liner notes Monge express that it was her longtime desire to record songs with the sounds of her native land.  This album earned Gold record status in Puerto Rico.  The release is currently out of print in all formats.

Track listing

Credits and personnel

Vocals: Yolandita Monge
Producer: Sergio George
Associate Producer: William Cepeda
Arrangements: Sergio George
Recorded: Sir Sound, Inc., New York
Engineer: Charlie Dos Santos
Assistants: Jeff Crews, Mario De Jesús
Mixing: Charlie Dos Santos, Sergio George
Piano & Drum Programming: Sergio George
Timbals & Bongó: Marc Quiñones
Congas & Percussion: Juan 'Papo' Pepín
Timbals: Rafael 'Tito' De Gracia
Percussion: Jesús Cepeda, Luis Daniel Cepeda, Roberto Cepeda
Tambourine: Héctor 'Tito' Matos

Bass: Rubén Rodríguez
Guitars: Bernd Schoenhart
Trumpets: Davis 'Piro' Rodríguez, Chris Rogers, Barry Danelien
Trombone: William Cepeda, Luis Bonilla, Ozzie Melémdez, Chris Washburn
Sax: Bobby Franceschini
Flute: Karen Joseph
Chorus: Luis Cabarcas, Huey Dunbar, Gabriela Anders, Milton Cardona, Ramón Rodríguez, Cita Rodríguez, Sergio George 
Photography: Fernando Báez, Omar Cruz
Cover Design: Arte Gráfico Y...

Notes

Track listing and credits from album booklet.
Released in Cassette Format on 1997 (18410-4).
Released digitally by ARDC Music Division on October 27, 2017 with the track listing in different order.

Track listing (2017 iTunes Version)

Charts

Albums charts

Singles charts

References

Yolandita Monge albums
1997 albums
Albums produced by Sergio George